Devi Khadka is a Nepalese communist politician from Dolakha, currently in the House of Representatives.

Life and career
Devi Khadka, a local of Dolakha, was a participant in the Nepalese Civil War, specifically joining the Communist Party of Nepal (Maoist) faction against the reigning monarchical government. Citing the oppression of the poor, the expropriation of her father's possessions, and the murder of her brother, Rit Bhadkur Khadka, by security forces, she participated in the 1990 People's Movement protests to liberalize the absolute monarchy. She later joined the Maoists in 1996 with the outbreak of the civil war initiated to introduce a People's Republic.

During the civil war, Khadka served as founding chair of the Maoist-affiliated All Nepal Women's Association (Revolutionary). In 1997, she was arrested, disappeared for a month, and repeatedly raped in police custody for four months. In 1999, she served as a military commander in Dolakha, Sindhupalchok, Okhaldhunga, and Solu Khumbu, eventually becoming district secretary of Dolakha in 2002.

Khadka has served as a Maoist MP for Dolakha since the conclusion of the civil war and establishment of the Nepalese Constituent Assembly in 2008. From 2011 to 2013, she served as a Minister of State for the Ministry of Physical Planning and Works.

Khadka has been involved in several controversies. Shanti Pakhrin, a fellow Dolakha MP for the United Marxist–Leninist party, has spoken out on the killing of her husband, Buddhi Man Pakhrin, by Maoist cadres in 2002 while Khadka was district secretary. In 2011, she and her husband and fellow Maoist politician, Raj Kumar Shrestha, were accused of overseeing Red sandalwood smuggling into Tibet through Nepal. In 2017, political violence days before local elections resulted in the murder of Kul Bahadur Tamang, son of CPN-UML candidate Gore Tamang, by Maoist-Centre cadres. Khadka claimed the Maoists were acting in self-defense. Following a complaint filed by Tamang to the police naming Khadka, among others, suspected cadres were arrested and a manhunt was launched.

Since late 2017, Khadka has been leading Maoist efforts in establishing a janaparishad shadow government to strengthen the party's relations at the grassroots level in Dolakha.

References 

Nepalese politicians
Nepalese communists
Nepalese feminists
Nepalese revolutionaries
Women in war
Maoism in Nepal
People from Dolakha District
1979 births
Living people
People of the Nepalese Civil War
Members of the 1st Nepalese Constituent Assembly